Masaki Station is the name of two train stations in Japan:

 Masaki Station (Ehime) (松前駅)
 Masaki Station (Miyazaki) (真幸駅)